North Rose-Wolcott Central School District is a school district in North Rose and Wolcott, New York, United States. The superintendent is Mr. Michael Pullen.

The district operates three schools: North Rose-Wolcott High School, Leavenworth Middle School, and North Rose Elementary School.

Administration 
The District offices are located at 11631 Salter-Colvin Road in Wolcott. The Superintendent is Mr. Michael Pullen.

Administrators 
Mr. Michael Pullen, Superintendent
Mr. Gary Barno, Interim School Business Administrator
Ms. Megan Paliotti, Director of Curriculum and Instruction
Ms. Sara McLean, Director of Special Education and Pupil Services
Mr. Marc Blankenberg, Director of Athletics

Board of Education 
Ms. Lucinda Collier–President
Mr. John Boogaard—Vice President
Ms. Linda Eygnor
Ms. Tina Reed
Mr. Jasen Sloan
Mr. Paul Statskey
Ms. Izetta Younglove

Selected former superintendents 
Previous assignment and reason for departure denoted in parentheses
Mr. Charles H. Kortz–?-2002)
Ms. Lucinda Miner–2002-2003 [interim](interim)
Dr. Daniel R. Starr–2003-2005 (Principal - Williamson High School, named Superintendent of Corinth Central School)
Ms. Lucinda Miner–2006-2010)
Mr. Harold E. Ferguson–2010 [interim]
Mr. John E. Walker–2010-2014 (Principal - Webster Thomas High School, retired)

North Rose-Wolcott High School 

North-Rose Wolcott High School is located at 11631 Salter-Colvin Road in Wolcott and serves grades 9 through 12. The principal position is Mr. Scott Bradley, and the current assistant principal is Mr. Jason Shetler.

History

Selected former principals 
Previous assignment and reason for departure denoted in parentheses
Mr. Theodore Woods
Mr. Robert P. Ceccarelli–?-2004 (unknown, retired)
Mr. William W. Rotenberg–2004-2007 (Principal - Marcus Whitman Middle School, named Principal of Geneva High School)
Mrs. June Muto–2007-2009 (Vice Principal - North-Rose Wolcott High School, returned to VP position)
Mrs. Varina Wilson–2009-2010 (Principal - Whitesville Central School, died)
Mr. Paul G. Benz–2011-2016 (Vice Principal - Webster Middle School, named Principal of Webster Schroeder High School)
Mr. Brian Read;2016-2020

Selected former assistant principals 
Previous assignment and reason for departure denoted in parentheses
Mr. Sherman Parker–1967-1975 (Curriculum Coordinator - North Rose-Wolcott Central School District, named Principal of Lyons Junior/Senior High School)
Mr. Robert Sherill
Mr. Edward J. Maguire–1980-1987 (Principal - Avon Elementary School, named Curriculum Coordinator of North Rose-Wolcott Central School District)
Ms. Angela Kirkey–2000-2004 (unknown, named Coordinator for Pupil Personnel Services of North Rose-Wolcott Central Schools)
Mrs. June Muto–2004-2007 (Math teacher - North Rose-Wolcott High School, named Principal of North Rose-Wolcott High School)
Mr. Paul Schiener–2007-208 (unknown, named Assistant Principal of Leavenworth Middle School)
Mr. John P. Sochha–2008 (Business/Computer teacher - North Rose-Wolcott High School, named Business/Computer teacher at Geneva High School)
Mr. Kyle Vacanti
Mrs. June Muto–2009-2011 (Principal - North Rose-Wolcott High School, named Assistant Principal of Leavenworth Middle School)
Mrs. Kathleen J. Hoyt–2011-2014 (Director of Athletics - North Rose-Wolcott Central School District, named Assistant Principal of North Rose-Wolcott Alternative High School)
Mr. Brian Read–2014-2016 (Math teacher at Newark Central School District, named Principal of North Rose-Wolcott High School)

Schedule

Leavenworth Middle School 

Leavenworth Middle School is located at 5957 New Hartford Street in Wolcott and serves grades 5 through 8. The current principal is Mr. Mark Mathews, and the current assistant principal is Dr. Brady Farnand.

History

Selected former principals 
Mr. John F. Boogaard Jr.–?-2007
Mrs. Michele Sullivan–2007-2013 (Principal - Avoca Central School, named Principal of Alternative Learning of North Rose-Wolcott Central School District)

Selected former assistant principals 
Previous assignment and reason for departure denoted in parentheses
Mr. Neil P. Thompson–1998-2003
Mr. Paul Schiener–2009-2011 (Vice Principal - North Rose-Wolcott High School, named Vice Principal of Tully Junior/Senior High School)
Mrs. June Muto–2011-2013 (Vice Principal - North Rose Wolcott High School, named Assistant Principal of North Rose Elementary School)

North Rose Elementary School 

North Rose Elementary School is located at 10456 Salter Road in North Rose and serves grades K through 4. The current principal is Mrs. Jennifer Hayden, and the current assistant principal is Ms. June Muto.

History 
For many years, North Rose Elementary served Grades 3 through 5. In 2011, the school re-consolidated to house Grades K to 4 after Florentine Hendrick Elementary was closed.

Selected former principals 
Ms. Mary Augusta Boogaard–?-2003
Mr. Neil Thompson–2003-2010

Defunct school

Florentine Hendrick Elementary School 

Florentine Hendrick Elementary School was located at 5751 New Hartford Street in Wolcott and served grades K through 2. The school closed in 2011.

History

Selected former principals 
Mrs. Linda Haensch–?-2011

Selected former administrators

*Denotes interim appointment

References

External links
Official site

Education in Wayne County, New York
School districts in New York (state)